The County of Orange was established in 1889 by founders William Spurgeon and James McFadden. The City of Santa Ana became the county seat the same year. Prior to its formation, the Orange County lands were part of Los Angeles County. 

Further back in history, California lands were organized into Spanish land grants or "Ranchos". In the case of Orange County, there is record of José Antonio Yorba and Juan Pablo Peralta (nephew) being granted Rancho Santiago de Santa Ana in 1810, year of the commencement of the war of Mexican Independence. Santiago de Santa Ana is recorded as the only Orange County land grant given under Spanish Rule.

Other surrounding land grants in Orange County were granted and recorded after 1821, that is, after the war of Mexican Independence and by the Mexican government. Some modern day cities in Orange County retain the names of the Mexican land grants as agreed upon in the Treaty of Guadalupe Hidalgo.

List of Orange County Ranchos

References
Beers, Henry Putney, (1979). Spanish & Mexican records of the American Southwest : a bibliographical guide to archive and manuscript sources, University of Arizona Press, Tucson
Pleasants, Adelene (1931). History of Orange County, California. Vol. 1, Los Angeles, CA : J. R. Finnell & Sons Publishing Company

External links
Santa Ana Public Library
City of Santa Ana
County of Orange
Orange County Recorder
Orange County Surveyor
Spanish and Mexican Ranchos of Orange County (At OC County web site)

See also
Ranchos of California

 
Orange County
History of Orange County, California